Krishnagiri may refer to:

Krishnagiri, a city in the Indian state of Tamil Nadu
Krishnagiri district, in the same state
Krishnagiri taluk, in the district
Krishnagiri block, in the district
Krishnagiri (Lok Sabha constituency), a constituency of the Parliament of India
Krishnagiri (state assembly constituency), a constituency of the Legislative Assembly of Tamil Nadu